Mongolia competed at the 2004 Summer Paralympics in Athens. The country was represented by three athletes competing in two sports, and did not win any medals.

Competitors

Archery

Men

|-
|align=left|Dambadondogiin Baatarjav
|align=left|Men's individual standing
|604
|9
|Bye
|W 153-143
|L 93-97
|colspan=3|did not advance
|}

Athletics

Men's track

Women's track

See also
Mongolia at the Paralympics
Mongolia at the 2004 Summer Olympics

References

External links
International Paralympic Committee

Nations at the 2004 Summer Paralympics
2004
Summer Paralympics